The men's 100 metres sprint competition of the athletics events at the 2015 Pan American Games took place between the 21 and 22 of July at the CIBC Pan Am and Parapan Am Athletics Stadium. The defending Pan American Games champion is Lerone Clarke of Jamaica.

Records
Prior to this competition, the existing world and Pan American Games records were as follows:

Qualification

Each National Olympic Committee (NOC) was able to enter up to two entrants providing they had met the minimum standard (10.38) in the qualifying period (January 1, 2014 to June 28, 2015).

Schedule

Results
All times shown are in seconds.

Heats
The fastest 4 in each heat and the next 4 fastest overall qualified for the semifinal.

Heat 1
Wind +1.9

Heat 2
Wind +3.3

Heat 3
Wind + 2.8

Semifinals
The fastest 3 in each heat and the next 2 fastest overall qualified for the final.

Semifinal 1
Wind + 1.5

Semifinal 2
Wind + 2.2

Final
Wind: +1.1

References

Athletics at the 2015 Pan American Games
2015